Stanley Walker Bingham (December 29, 1945 – October 27, 2022) was an American politician, a Republican member of the North Carolina General Assembly representing the state's thirty-third Senate district, including constituents in Davidson and Guilford counties. A small town newspaper publisher and retired lumber company owner from Denton, North Carolina, Bingham formerly served in the state Senate.

Before being elected to the North Carolina General Assembly, Bingham served as chairman of the Davidson County Commissioners. Bingham was married to Lora Bingham; he was first elected to the North Carolina Senate in 2000. He completed 8 terms in 2016 and retired from the Senate in 2017. During his tenure, he introduced and passed 171 bills, many of which were consumer protection related.

Bingham died of natural causes at his home in Denton, North Carolina, on October 27, 2022. He was 76.

References

External links

|-

1945 births
2022 deaths
County commissioners in North Carolina
Republican Party North Carolina state senators
21st-century American politicians
People from Denton, North Carolina
Politicians from Winston-Salem, North Carolina
Businesspeople from Winston-Salem, North Carolina